Meenakshi is an Indian given name, usually feminine.

Notable people (female unless otherwise noted) with the name include:

Given name
 Meenakshi (Nayak queen) (1700-1736), queen regnant of the Madurai Nayak Kingdom 1731–1736
 Meenakshi Amma (born 1941), Indian martial artist
 Meenakshi Anoop (born 2005), Indian actress in Malayalam films
 Meenakshi Arora, Indian lawyer
 Meenakshi Banerjee, Indian cyanobacteriologist
 Meenakshi Chaudhary (born 1997), Indian actress and model
 Meenakshi Chitharanjan, Indian classical dancer and choreographer
 Meenakshi Dixit (born 1993), Indian actress in Telugu, Tamil, Hindi, Malayalam, and Kannada films
 Meenakshi Gigi Durham, Indian-American professor of communication studies
 Meenakshi Gopinath, Indian educationist, political scientist, and writer
 Meenakshi Goswami (born 1933), Indian actress mainly in Bengali films
 Meenakshi Jain, Indian political scientist and historian
 Meenakshi Lekhi (born 1967), Indian politician
 Meenakshi Madan Rai (born 1964), Indian judge
 Meenakshi Mukherjee (1936/7–2009), Indian writer and educator
 Meenakshi Narain (1964–2022), Indian-American physicist
 Meenakshi Natarajan (born 1973), Indian politician
 Meenakshi Pahuja (born 1978), Indian lecturer and marathon swimmer
 Meenakshi Patel, Indian politician
 Meenakshi Sundaram Pillai (1815–1876), Indian male Tamil scholar and teacher
 Meenakshi Reddy Madhavan, Indian blogger who writes under the pseudonym eM
 Meenakshi Sargogi (1944–2020), Indian industrialist
 Meenakshi Shinde, Indian politician
 Meenakshi Srinivasan (born 1971), Indian classical dancer and choreographer
 Meenakshi Thampan, Indian politician
 Meenakshi Thapar (1984/5–2012), Indian actress in Hindi-language films
 Meenakshi Vijayakumar, Indian firefighter; first Indian woman fire officer
 Meenakshi Wadhwa, American planetary scientist

Pseudonym
 Meenakshi (actress), Pinky Sarkar (born 1982), Indian actress in Tamil, Telugu, and Malayalam language films
 Meenakshi (Malayalam actress), Maria Margaret Sharmilee (born 1985), Indian actress in Malayalam films
 Meenakshi Sheshadri, Shashikala Sheshadri (born 1963), Indian actress in Hindi, Tamil, and Telugu films
 Meenakshi Shirodkar, Ratan Pednekar (1916–1997), Indian actress mainly in Marathi films

References